Księcia Janusza (the Polish for "Prince Janusz") is a M2 metro line Warsaw Metro station in Wola district, by the intersection of Górczewska and Księcia Janusza streets.

The station is 606.1 m in length, and the cubic capacity at 188 480 m³. The green colour scheme of the station refers to the nearby parks: Moczydło Park and Edward Szymański Park.

Description

The station is located 700 m west of Wola Park shopping mall and Ulricha Park and 400 m east of Moczydło Park and Edward Szymański Park.

The contractor for the station was Gülermak, which won the tender completed on 29 October 2015. The construction works began on 26 November 2016. Along with Młynów and Płocka, the station is part of the extension of the M2 metro line from Rondo Daszyńskiego to Wola. All three stations opened on 4 April 2020.

Gallery

External links
Detailed map of  Line M2 from official Warsaw Metro site

References 

Railway stations in Poland opened in 2020
Line 2 (Warsaw Metro) stations
Wola